Always Trouble with the Teachers is a 1968 West German comedy film directed by Harald Vock and starring Roy Black, Uschi Glas, and Peter Weck.

Partial cast

References

Bibliography

External links 
 

1968 films
1968 comedy films
German comedy films
West German films
1960s German-language films
Films about educators
Gloria Film films
Films directed by Harald Vock
1960s German films